James P. McConlogue (May 12, 1914 – October 28, 1967) was an American football coach.  He served as the head football coach at Lafayette College from 1958 to 1962, compiling a record of 20–23–2.  McConlogue was born on May 12, 1914.  He died on October 28, 1967, in Greenville, South Carolina, after suffering a heart attack while coaching for Lehigh against Furman.

Head coaching record

References

1914 births
1967 deaths
American men's basketball players
Colorado Buffaloes football coaches
Lafayette Leopards football coaches
Lehigh Mountain Hawks football coaches
Moravian Greyhounds football players
Moravian Greyhounds men's basketball players
High school football coaches in New Jersey
High school football coaches in Pennsylvania